Robert Bernard Martin (1918–1999) was an American scholar and biographer, specializing in Victorian literature.  Under the pseudonym Robert Bernard he also published a novel.

Life
Robert Bernard Martin was born on September 11, 1918, in La Harpe, Illinois, to Carl and Maggie Martin. He graduated from high school in Davenport and received his A.B. summa cum laude from the University of Iowa in 1943. During World War II he served in the U.S. Army Air Forces in Italy and France. He was a professor of English at Princeton University from 1951 to 1975, when he retired to Oxford.

Martin published several books about the Victorian era, including biographies of Alfred Tennyson, Gerard Manley Hopkins and Edward Fitzgerald. His life of Tennyson won the James Tait Black Award and the Duff Cooper Prize.

In addition to his scholarly works, Martin also authored one clever and humorous mystery entitled Deadly Meeting.  Presumably to avoid confusing his academic readers, he published this under the name of Robert Bernard.  Deadly Meeting centers on the ongoing difficulties of operating the English Department at small (imaginary) Wilton University in New England ultimately leading to the murder of one of the professors.  Perhaps the most endearing character is the victim's visiting replacement, Dame Millicent Hetherege, a retired Oxford professor of medieval literature, particularly enamored of maximal salary and good scotch whisky who, of course, plays an essential part in the mystery's solution.

Works
 Charlotte Brontë's Novels: The Accents of Persuasion (1948)
 The Dust of Combat: A Life of Charles Kingsley (1959)
 Enter Rumour: Four Early Victorian Scandals (1962)
 Victorian Poetry; Ten Major Poets: Tennyson, Browning, Arnold, Meredith, D. G. Rossetti, Christina Rossetti, Swinburne, Hardy, Hopkins, Housman (1964)
 Deadly Meeting (1970)  by Robert Bernard
 The Triumph of Wit: A Study of Victorian Comic Theory (1974)
 Tennyson: The Unquiet Heart (1980)
 With Friends Possessed: A Life of Edward FitzGerald (1985)
 Gerard Manley Hopkins: A Very Private Life (1991)

References

1918 births
1999 deaths
People from Hancock County, Illinois
20th-century American biographers
Historians from Illinois
United States Army Air Forces personnel of World War II
University of Iowa alumni
Princeton University faculty